Garri Yakovlevich Bardin (born September 11, 1941) is a Soviet and Russian animation director, screenwriter, producer and actor best known for his experimental musical and stop motion films. He was awarded the 1988 Short Film Palme d'Or for the Fioritures cartoon and the Order of Honour in 2011.

Biography
Garri Bardin was born as Garri Yakovlevich Bardenstein in Chkalov (modern-day Orenburg, Orenburg Oblast of Russia) where his pregnant mother Rozalia Abramovna Bardenshtein had been evacuated from Kyiv with the start of the Great Patriotic War. The family was Jewish. His father Yakov Lvovich Bardenshtein was a naval officer who joined marines in 1941 and took part in the Battle of Stalingrad. After the war, the family moved to Liepāja, Latvian SSR where his father served at the Baltic Fleet.

Garri spent three years in the Soviet Army, and in 1968, he finished the Actor's Faculty at the Moscow Art Theatre School and joined the N. V. Gogol Moscow Drama Theatre (modern-day Gogol Center) where he served till 1973. The director asked him to shorten his surname which was too long for theatre posters, and he adapted the Bardin stage name. Upon leaving the theatre he spent some time writing stories, plays and TV screenplays. He had been also voicing cartoons since 1967.

Around the same time, he sent a screenplay to Soyuzmultfilm and was suggested to direct the cartoon by himself despite the lack of education. From then on, he worked as an animation director. Among his first shorts was A Tincan segment from the Happy Merry-Go-Round No. 8 anthology series (1976). In 1979, he directed The Flying Ship, a traditionally animated musical film loosely based on the old Russian fairy tale The Fool of the World and the Flying Ship. The film and the songs by Yuri Entin in particular gained popularity. Bardin then worked on several other hand-drawn films along with Entin.

In 1983, he directed his first experimental stop motion cartoon for adults — Conflict, a Cold War allegory where two groups of matches enter a conflict which leads to a war. It was followed by several claymation comedy films, including Break!, a parody on a boxing match for which Bardin received a Golden Dove award at the 1986 Dok Leipzig. In 1987, he released two films: Marriage made of ropes and Fioritures made of aluminium wire for which he was awarded the 1988 Short Film Palme d'Or at the Cannes Film Festival.

In 1990, he directed his last Soyuzmultiflm cartoon — Grey Wolf and Little Red Riding Hood, a claymation musical film that satirized last days of the USSR. It was awarded a number of awards, including Grand Prix for the best short film at the 1991 Annecy International Animation Film Festival and the 1992 Nika Award for the best animated film. After that, Bardin founded and headed the Stayer animation studio where he continued directing claymation and stop motion films, as well as TV commercials. After six years in production, he finally released his first feature animated musical The Ugly Duckling (2010) loosely based on the Hans Christian Andersen's fairy tale of the same name, with a heavy influence of George Orwell's Animal Farm. It received mixed reviews from critics and failed at the box office, while central Russian TV channels refused to show it according to Bardin. At the same time, it gained a number of awards, including the 2011 Nika Award.

Bardin was married three times. His son from the third marriage  (born 1975) is a Russian film director.

Selected filmography

 Little Locomotive from Romashkovo / Паровозик из Ромашково (1967) - voice actor (policeman)
 Happy Merry-Go-Round / Весёлая карусель No. 8 (1976) - director, screenwriter
 The Adventures of Buratino / Приключения Буратино (1976) - voice actor (spider)
 Practical Joke / Розыгрыш (1977) - actor (French teacher)
 The Flying Ship / Летучий корабль (1979) - director, voice actor (tsar)
 Moscow Does Not Believe in Tears / Москва слезам не верит (1979) - actor (chief engineer)
 Pif-Paf, Oi-Oi-Oi! / Пиф-паф, ой-ой-ой! (1980) - co-director with Vitaly Peskov, voice actor (commentator)
 Fitil / Фитиль (1980—1981) - director
 Conflict / Конфликт (1983) - director, screenwriter
 Break! / Брэк! (1985) - director, screenwriter, voice actor (commentator)
 Banquet  / Банкет (1986) - director, screenwriter
 Wedding / Брак (1987) - director, screenwriter, voice actor (Busya)
  Fioritures / Выкрутасы (1987) - director, screenwriter, voice actor (wire man)
 Grey Wolf and Little Red Riding Hood / Серый Волк энд Красная Шапочка (1990) - director, screenwriter, voice actor (announcer, Gena the Crocodile)
 Puss in Boots / Кот в сапогах (1995) - director, screenwriter
 Chucha / Чуча (1997) - director, screenwriter, producer, voice actor (guest)
 Adagio / Адажио (2000) - director, screenwriter, producer 
 Chucha 2 / Чуча-2 (2001) - director, screenwriter, producer, voice actor (pirate, radio commentator)
 Chucha 3 / Чуча-3 (2004) - director, screenwriter, producer, voice actor (cow)
 The Ugly Duckling / Гадкий утёнок (2010) - director, screenwriter, producer, voice actor (drake)
  Three melodys / Три мелодии (2013) - director, screenwriter, producer
  Listening to Beethoven / Слушая Бетховена (2016) - director, screenwriter, producer
  Bolero-17 / Болеро-17 (2018) - director, screenwriter, producer
  Sandbox / Песочница (2021) - director, screenwriter, producer

Rewards
"Palme d'Or" at the Cannes Film Festival for the cartoon "Freaks" - 1988.
Nika Award for Best Animated Film (Grey Wolf and Little Red Riding Hood) - 1992.
Award "Nika" for the best animated film ("Chucha") - 1999.
State Prize of the Russian Federation in 1998 in the field of cinematography (June 4, 1999) - for the original solution of artistic problems and the innovative use of expressive means in animated films.
Nika Award for Best Animated Film (Adagio) - 2001.
Award "Nika" for the best animated film ("Chucha-3") - 2005.
Triumph Prize.
Nika Award for Best Animated Film (The Ugly Duckling) - 2011.
Order of Honor (October 13, 2011) - for merits in the development of national culture and art, many years of fruitful activity.
Award of the Federation of Jewish Communities of Russia "Fiddler on the Roof" - 2015.
Prize of the Moscow Helsinki Group for the protection of human rights through culture and art - 2017.
International Film Award “East-West. Golden Arch" for contribution to cinema - 2021.

See also
 History of Russian animation

References

External links
Garry Bardin at animator.ru

Studio Stayer's Homepage
Channel on YouTube

1941 births
20th-century Russian artists
20th-century Russian male actors
21st-century Russian artists
21st-century Russian male actors
Living people
People from Orenburg
Academicians of the Russian Academy of Cinema Arts and Sciences "Nika"
Moscow Art Theatre School alumni
Recipients of the Nika Award
Recipients of the Order of Honour (Russia)
State Prize of the Russian Federation laureates
Jewish artists
Jewish Russian actors
Russian animated film directors
Russian animators
Russian film directors
Russian Jews
Russian male film actors
Russian male stage actors
Russian male voice actors
20th-century Russian screenwriters
Male screenwriters
20th-century Russian male writers
Soviet animation directors
Soviet animators
Soviet film directors
Soviet Jews
Soviet male film actors
Soviet male stage actors
Soviet male voice actors
Stop motion animators
Soviet screenwriters
Russian activists against the 2022 Russian invasion of Ukraine